Grazing-incidence small-angle scattering (GISAS) is a scattering technique used to study nanostructured surfaces and thin films. The scattered probe is either photons (grazing-incidence small-angle X-ray scattering, GISAXS) or neutrons (grazing-incidence small-angle neutron scattering, GISANS). GISAS combines the accessible length scales of small-angle scattering (SAS: SAXS or SANS) and the surface sensitivity of grazing incidence diffraction (GID).

Applications

A typical application of GISAS is the characterisation of self-assembly and self-organization on the nanoscale in thin films. Systems studied by GISAS include quantum dot arrays,
growth instabilities formed during in-situ growth,
self-organized nanostructures in thin films of block copolymers,
silica mesophases,
and nanoparticles.

GISAXS was introduced by Levine and Cohen to study the dewetting of gold deposited on a glass surface. The technique was further developed by Naudon and coworkers to study metal agglomerates on surfaces and in buried interfaces. With the advent of nanoscience other applications evolved quickly, first in hard matter such as the characterization of quantum dots on semiconductor surfaces and the in-situ characterization of metal deposits on oxide surfaces. This was soon to be followed by soft matter systems such as ultrathin polymer films, polymer blends, block copolymer films and other self-organized nanostructured thin films that have become indispensable for nanoscience and technology. Future challenges of GISAS may lie in biological applications, such as proteins, peptides, or viruses attached to surfaces or in lipid layers.

Interpretation

As a hybrid technique, GISAS combines concepts from transmission small-angle scattering (SAS), from grazing-incidence diffraction (GID), and from diffuse reflectometry. From SAS it uses the form factors and structure factors. From GID it uses the scattering geometry close to the critical angles of substrate and film, and the two-dimensional character of the scattering, giving rise to diffuse rods of scattering intensity perpendicular to the surface. With diffuse (off-specular) reflectometry it shares phenomena like the Yoneda/Vinyard peak at the critical angle of the sample, and the scattering theory, the distorted wave Born approximation (DWBA). However, while diffuse reflectivity remains confined to the incident plane (the plane given by the incident beam and the surface normal), GISAS explores the whole scattering from the surface in all directions, typically utilizing an area detector. Thus GISAS gains access to a wider range of lateral and vertical structures and, in particular, is sensitive to the morphology and preferential alignment of nanoscale objects at the surface or inside the thin film.

As a particular consequence of the DWBA, the refraction of x-rays or neutrons has to be always taken into account in the case of thin film studies, due to the fact that scattering angles are small, often less than 1 deg. The refraction correction applies to the perpendicular component of the scattering vector with respect to the substrate while the parallel component is unaffected. Thus parallel scattering can often be interpreted within the kinematic theory of SAS, while refractive corrections apply to the scattering along perpendicular cuts of the scattering image, for instance along a scattering rod.

In the interpretation of GISAS images some complication arises in the scattering from low-Z films e.g. organic materials on silicon wafers, when the incident angle is in between the critical angles of the film and the substrate. In this case, the reflected beam from the substrate has a similar strength as the incident beam and thus the scattering from the reflected beam from the film structure can give rise to a doubling of scattering features in the perpendicular direction. This as well as interference between the scattering from the direct and the reflected beam can be fully accounted for by the DWBA scattering theory.

These complications are often more than offset by the fact that the dynamic enhancement of the scattering intensity is significant.  In combination with the straightforward scattering geometry, where all relevant information is contained in a single scattering image, in-situ and real-time experiments are facilitated. Specifically self-organization during MBE growth and re-organization processes in block copolymer films under the influence of solvent vapor have been characterized on the relevant timescales ranging from seconds to minutes. Ultimately the time resolution is limited by the x-ray flux on the samples necessary to collect an image and the read-out time of the area detector.

Experimental practice

Dedicated or partially dedicated GISAXS beamlines exist at many synchrotron light sources (for instance SSRL, APS, CHESS, ESRF, HASYLAB, NSLS, Pohang Light Source) and also Advanced Light Source at LBNL.

At neutron research facilities,
GISANS is increasingly used,
typically on small-angle (SANS) instruments or on reflectometers.

GISAS does not require any specific sample preparation other than thin film deposition techniques. Film thicknesses may range from a few nm to several 100 nm, and such thin films are still fully penetrated by the x-ray beam. The film surface, the film interior, as well as the substrate-film interface are all accessible. By varying the incidence angle the various contributions can be identified.

References

External links

 GISAXS and GIWAXS tutorial by Detlef Smilgies - Updated Link!
 GISAXS wiki by Kevin Yager
 isGISAXS modelling/fitting software by Rémi Lazzari
 FitGISAXS modelling/fitting software by David Babonneau
 BornAgain modelling and fitting software by Scientific Computing Group of MLZ Garching
 HiPGISAXS Massively Parallel GISAXS simulation code by LBNL

X-rays
Scattering
Synchrotron-related techniques
Scientific techniques
Neutron scattering
Nanotechnology